Askerabad may refer to:
Askerabad, Azerbaijan
Askerabad, Iran